Alta Flights was a charter airline based in Edmonton, Alberta, Canada. It operated regional passenger and cargo charters throughout Canada and the United States. Its main base was Edmonton International Airport, with hubs at Edmonton City Centre Airport and at Calgary International Airport.

History 
The airline was established and started operations in 1986 as Alberta Express. It started scheduled services on 19 November 2001. Scheduled services were suspended on 1 January 2006. It was wholly owned by Telford Resources and has 105 employees. As of 1 October 2014, Alta Flights became part of Sunwest Aviation.

See also 
 List of defunct airlines of Canada

References

External links 
Alta Flights
Historical fleet

Regional airlines of Alberta
Companies based in Edmonton
Air Transport Association of Canada
Airlines established in 1986
1986 establishments in Alberta
Defunct airlines of Canada
Canadian companies established in 1986